CSX Transportation's Valrico Subdivision is a railroad line in Central Florida. It serves as CSX's main route through a region of Central Florida known as the Bone Valley, which contains the largest known deposits of phosphate in the United States.  

The Valrico Subdivision runs from a junction with CSX's S Line in Valrico east to Mulberry and Bartow before turning south to Fort Meade and Bowling Green for a total of 47 miles.

Much of the Valrico Subdivision dates back to the early 1900s and was originally operated under the same name by the Seaboard Air Line Railroad, a CSX predecessor. Though track to Bowling Green was previously operated by the Atlantic Coast Line Railroad, another CSX predecessor.

Operation

The Valrico Subdivision is currently CSX's busiest rail line thorough Bone Valley and carries large amounts of phosphate traffic, its main commodity.  The line is mostly dispatched by Track Warrant Control, though there is a small Centralized Traffic Control signal system around Mulberry between IMC and Ridgewood.

The line serves phosphate facilities operated by The Mosaic Company, which was created in 2004 after the merger of Cargill Inc. and IMC Global.  Mosaic's South Fort Meade Mine is located near the end of the Valrico Subdivision between Fort Meade and Bowling Green.  The line also serves Mosaic's processing facility at Ridgewood and previously served the Bonnie Mine just southeast of Mulberry.  

Both raw and processed phosphate from these facilities (as well as facilities on CSX's Brewster Subdivision and Bone Valley Subdivision) are transported on the line to Valrico, where they continue on the S Line west to Tampa and then transferred to ships at Rockport Yard in Tampa.  Phosphate is also sent north from Mulberry to Winston Yard (on the Bone Valley Subdivision) to be sent via rail throughout the country.

History
The 47 miles of track that are today the Valrico Subdivision were built incrementally from the late 1800s and early 20th century as the phosphate industry in Bone Valley began expanding.

Valrico to Bartow and Homeland

The Seaboard Air Line Railroad built the segment of the line from Welcome Junction to Nichols around 1905.  It was built as an extension of the Plant City, Arcadia, and Gulf Railroad (which is today the Plant City Subdivision), which Seaboard had bought earlier that year.  Seaboard extended the line east to Mulberry and Bartow in 1912.  At the same time, Seaboard also built track from Edison Junction southeast to Bradley Junction to connect with the Charlotte Harbor and Northern Railway.

The Valrico Subdivision crossed the Atlantic Coast Line Railroad's Bone Valley Branch (now the Bone Valley Subdivision) in Mulberry.  The junction of these two lines is today located in the median of State Road 37 and the lines are connected through Mulberry Yard.  The line also connected to the Charlotte Harbor and Northern Railway (now the Achan Subdivision) in Mulberry which at the time went as far as Port Boca Grande where a vast majority of phosphate was shipped in the early 20th century.  

By 1916, Seaboard would extend the line east from Bartow to Lake Wales, Alcoma, Hesperides, and Walinwa.  At Walinwa, the line connected to the Kissimmee River Railway which continued east to Nalaca where it served a turpentine mill.  Track from just east of Bartow (at a point known historically as Pembroke Junction) south to Homeland was part of a Seaboard spur built in 1914 to the now-defunct Coronet Pembroke Mine.  Track east of Bartow to Lake Wales was abandoned in the early 1980s (the junction where the Plant City Subdivision meets the CSX S Line in Plant City is still known today as Lake Wales Junction because of this extension).

Seaboard built the Valrico Cutoff in 1925 which connected the Seaboard main line (CSX's S Line) at Valrico with the track at Welcome Junction.  This is today is the westernmost trackage of the line and it was built to shorten the distance from Mulberry to Tampa. Seaboard designated the line as the Valrico Subdivision. The Valrico Cutoff also crossed Seaboard's Sarasota Subdivision at Durant which also shortened the distance from Tampa to Sarasota.  

Passenger service would also operate on the Valrico Subdivision.  Seaboard would operate the Cross Florida Limited over the line, which was one of the first rail services to connect Tampa and Miami directly.  Trains accessed Miami through the Seaboard's Miami Subdivision in West Lake Wales (which was also completed in the 1920s).  The Cross Florida Limited would also have passenger stops in Mulberry and Bartow. The Mulberry depot still stands and is now a phosphate museum.

Homeland to Bowling Green

The oldest trackage of the current Varico Subdivision is its south-easternmost trackage from Homeland (just south of Bartow) to Fort Meade and Bowling Green.  This segment was built in 1886 by the Florida Southern Railway as their Charlotte Harbor Division (which later became the Atlantic Coast Line Railroad's Lakeland–Fort Myers Line). Today, this segment of the Valrico Subdivision ends less than a mile south of the Polk/Hardee County line in Bowling Green (just south of the South Fort Meade Mine).  The line was abandoned north of Homeland and south of Bowling Green in the late 1980s.  The Atlantic Coast Line's former passenger depot in Fort Meade still stands along the line, and the Bowling Green depot stands about a hundred yards south of the end of the track.

Later years

The Atlantic Coast Line and Seaboard Air Line Railroads merged in 1967 to form the Seaboard Coast Line Railroad, which brought all of the track under a single owner.  In the Seaboard Coast Line era, the Valrico Subdivision designation continued to cover the line from Valrico east through Bartow and West Lake Wales, which was still in service at the time.  Track east of West Lake Wales was redesignated as the Lake Wales Subdivision.  Track was removed between Bartow and West Lake Wales by 1982. Remaining track east of West Lake Wales is now operated by the Florida Midland Railroad.  

The track from Homeland to Bowling Green (which still ran from Lakeland to Fort Myers in the years after the merger) was part of the Fort Myers Subdivision. When the Fort Myers Subdivision was abandoned north of Homeland and south of Bowling Green in the late 1980s, the remaining track was annexed to the Valrico Subdivision (CSX's CH Spur and the Seminole Gulf Railway south of Arcadia are discontinuous segments of this line).

In 1980, the Seaboard Coast Line's parent company merged with the Chessie System, creating the CSX Corporation.  The CSX Corporation initially operated the Chessie and Seaboard Systems separately until 1986, when they were merged into CSX Transportation.

Milepost numbers
Despite being a continuous line today, the milepost numbers on the Valrico Subdivision are not continuous throughout and remain as they originally were under predecessor companies (the Atlantic Coast Line and the Seaboard Air Line).

The segment from Valrico to Welcome Junction (the Valrico Cutoff) is numbered independently from the rest of the line since that was the last track segment to be built.  It is numbered SZ 0.0 through SZ 11.8.

From Welcome Junction east to Bartow, the mileposts are numbered SV 834.2 through SV 851.1 (numbering which continues from the Plant City Subdivision).  When the line turns south on to the former Seaboard Pembroke Mine spur in Bartow, the numbering continues with the prefix SVE since the SV prefix continued along the former east continuation to West Lake Wales.

In Homeland, where the line transitions to the former Atlantic Coast Line track, the mileposts abruptly change at approximately SVE 857.3 to AX 870.8 reflecting the Atlantic Coast Line numbering.  The end of the line today is at milepost AX 882.7 in Bowling Green.

Historic Seaboard Air Line stations

See also
 List of CSX Transportation lines
 Main Line (Seaboard Air Line Railroad)
 Charlotte Harbor and Northern Railway

References

CSX Transportation lines
Seaboard Air Line Railroad
Transportation in Hillsborough County, Florida
Transportation in Polk County, Florida
Transportation in Hardee County, Florida